Bir Hima is a rock art site in Najran province, in southwest Saudi Arabia, about  north of the city of Najran. An ancient Palaeolithic and Neolithic site, the Bir Hima Complex covers the time period of 7000–1000 BC. Bir Hima contains numerous troughs whose type is similar from North Arabia to Yemen.

It was designated as part of the Hima Cultural Area UNESCO World Heritage Site in July 2021.

History
Ancient history of human occupation of this habitat is credited to its resources of wild life, water and the limestone terrain. Saudi Arabia's rock art, which has found appreciation in recent years, is considered among the richest in the world along with other examples found in Australia, India and South Africa. The area was explored by the Philby-Ryckmans-Lippen expedition of 1951 and published by E. Anati (1969–72). It was then noted that the images on the rocks were inscribed with inset into the sandstone formation, dated 300–200 BC. Its rich heritage of rock petroglyphs caught the attention of Saudi Arabia's Department of Antiquities only after 1976 when Jubba and other sites were investigated. One of the expedition members investigating this art form found a site west of the ancient wells of Bir Hima where he recorded 250 images.

Findings
Bir Hima, which is an ancient Palaeolithic and Neolithic site, lies north of Najran, categorized as a Lower Palaeolithic or Oldowan site. Apart from petroglyphs, carving tools used for this art work (in the form of chopper or pebble tools) were also found here, made of such materials as quartzite, andesite and flint. The images appear to have been inscribed with Bronze. The petroglyphs noted, when initially found in the 1950s, consisted of daggers and swords, bows with arrows tipped with transverse arrowheads, sickle swords and throw-sticks. These depictions were interpreted as symbolic of spiritual animism. 
 
Bir Hima, as part of Najran, is a treasure trove of petroglyphs, eclipsed only by those found in the Jubba region. Here, 100 sites have been identified. In the Najran area, as many as 6,400 human and animal illustrations, which include more than 1,800 camels and 1,300 human depictions, have been recorded. At this important rock art site, apart from depictions of humans, giraffes and other animals, the sixth century inscriptions of Dhu Nuwas, a Himyarite King who occupied Najran, are also recorded. A number of articulated camel fragments were excavated at site 217-44. While its engravings are probably much earlier than those of Hunters Palette, the Bir Hima warrior, armed with bow, is almost identical to the men on the Hunters Palette. Thousands of inscriptions have also been found, in various scripts including the al-musmad alphabet, Aramaic-Nabatean, South Arabian, Greek and Islamic.

Gallery

References

Rock art in Saudi Arabia
Prehistoric art
Visual arts media
Najran Province
Archaeological sites in Saudi Arabia
Petroglyphs
Sculpture of the Ancient Near East